Funkentelechy vs. the Placebo Syndrome is the sixth album by funk band Parliament, released in 1977.

It is a loose concept album warning the listener of falling into the "Placebo Syndrome," which according to George Clinton is consumerism, and listening to disco music, which he saw as a simplification of funk music in attempt to gain commercial success. The album spawned the R&B number #1 single in "Flash Light", which features a funky synthesizer bass line played on a Minimoog by keyboardist Bernie Worrell. The album became Parliament's fourth consecutive gold album and second platinum album. The song "Sir Nose d'Voidoffunk (Pay Attention – B3M)" contains nursery rhymes "Baa, Baa, Black Sheep" and "Three Blind Mice"; the lyrics were changed to refer to drug use.

The original vinyl release contained a 22″×33″ poster of the character Sir Nose D'Voidoffunk, as well as an 8-page comic book that explains the concept behind the LP. Both the poster and the comic book were illustrated by Overton Loyd.

Critical reception

Track listing

Personnel
Vocals – George Clinton, Ray Davis, Glenn Goins, Garry Shider, Debbie Wright, Jeanette Washington, Lynn Mabry, Dawn Silva, Cordell Mosson, Mallia Franklin (not included on liner notes)
Keyboards and synthesizers – Bernie Worrell (Keyboard bass on "Flash Light")
Guitars – Michael Hampton, Glenn Goins, Garry Shider; Phelps Collins on "Flash Light"
Bass guitar – Cordell Mosson, Bootsy Collins
Drums and percussion – Jerome Brailey; Bootsy Collins on "Flash Light"
Horns – Fred Wesley, Maceo Parker, Rick Gardner, Richard Griffith, Clay Lawrey, Darryl Dixon, Valerie Drayton, Danny Cortez
Extra-extra terrestrial funk bearing alumni-Strokers, Chokers, Clappers and Chanters – Bootsy Collins, Phelps Collins, Frank Waddy, Rick Gilmore, Gary Cooper, Robert Johnson, Billy Nelson, Ron Ford, Lou Goldman, Joel Johnson, Bootsy's Rubber Band, The Brides of Funkenstein, Parlet, and The Horny Horns.
According to George Clinton, Mallia Franklin also sang on this album with other original Parlet members Debbie Wright and Jeanette Washington but she is not listed on the album's credits.

Horn arrangement by Bernie Worrell and Fred Wesley

Production
Produced by George Clinton
Engineered by Jim Vitti  
Mixing assistance by Bernie Worrell
Mastered by Allen Zentz
Photography by Ron Slenzak
Album graphics by Stephen Lumel/Gribbitt!
Booklet story and illustrated by Overton Loyd
Booklet coloring and collaboration by Shelby Mack

Charts

Weekly charts

Certifications

References 

Parliament (band) albums
1977 albums
Casablanca Records albums
Science fiction concept albums